The European, billed as "Europe's first national newspaper", was a British weekly newspaper founded by Robert Maxwell. It was published from 11 May 1990 until December 1998.

History
Maxwell founded the paper in the fervour which immediately followed the destruction of the Berlin Wall and collapse of the Iron Curtain: the name was a reflection of the feelings of pan-European unity which were brought on by the historic changes, an ideal which Maxwell wholeheartedly supported. According to Time magazine, Maxwell originally envisaged a daily with a circulation of 650,000, but by the launch date plans had been cut down to a more realistic weekly with a circulation of 225,000. In the event, the circulation peaked at 180,000, over half of which was British.

Following Maxwell's death, the Barclay brothers bought the newspaper in 1992, investing an estimated $110 million and in 1996 transforming it into a high-end tabloid format oriented at the business community edited by Andrew Neil.

In 1996, The European had a staff of 70 in London, 3 in Brussels, 1 in Paris, 1 in Berlin, 1 in Moscow, as well as a network of 100 freelance writers throughout Europe.

Among the newspaper's innovations was a weekly short fiction contribution from published and previously unpublished writers.

The New European (a pro-EU newspaper founded in 2016 following the Brexit referendum) is partially inspired by The European's experience.

Editors
1990: Ian Watson
1991: John Bryant
1992: Charles Garside
1993: Herbert Pearson
1994: Charles Garside
1996: Andrew Neil
1998: Gerry Malone

Contributors (partial list)
 Nigel Cox
 Jean Cavé
 Bronwyn Cosgrave
 Jean Schalit
 Roger Faligot
 Peter Millar
 Jane Mulvagh
 Stephanie Theobald
 Peter Ustinov
 Mark Porter
 Walter Ellis
 Anne-Elisabeth Moutet
 Tim Walker, later to work on The New European
 Teodor Troev, later a Financial Times contributor

References

Further reading 
 Robert Maxwell's The European, Magforum.com

See also
The New European

1990 establishments in the United Kingdom
1998 disestablishments in the United Kingdom
Publications established in 1990
Publications disestablished in 1998
1992 mergers and acquisitions
Defunct newspapers published in the United Kingdom
Defunct weekly newspapers
Weekly newspapers published in the United Kingdom
David and Frederick Barclay